Chittagong Government Women's College is a government owned college only for women. It is located at Nasirabad area in Chittagong. It was established in 1957.

History 
The purpose of establishing a women's institution was offering education to the women in restrictive families in Bangladesh. Thus some social reformers and educationalists tried to make an institution only for women in Chittagong. Thus they founded Chittagong Government Women's College. Its academic and administrative works started in Victoria Islamic Hostel just beside the Andarkilla Shahi Jame Mosque. In the beginning, it started its activities with only 150 students and 8 teachers. The teachers taught without any salary. The first principal of this institution was Sri Jogesh Chandra Singha. Badsha Mia Chowdhury and some social reformers offered 20 acres land for this institution at Khulshi area in Chittagong. In 1961/1962, the institution moved here from its initial place. It nationalized in 1968. Business studies group started in 2006–2007.

Affiliations

Administration 
Current principal of this institution is Md. Abul Hasan. And vice principal is Tahmina Akhter Nur.

Academics 
Chittagong Government Women's College offers HSC, Honours courses, and master's degree courses.

Honours courses 
 Bangla
 English
 Islamic History and Culture
 Philosophy
 Political Science
 Sociology
 Social Work
 Economics
 Psychology

Master's final courses 
 Bangla
 Islamic History and Culture
 Philosophy
 Economics

Degree (pass) courses 
 B. A. (Pass)
 B. S. S. (Pass)
 B.Sc. (Pass)
 B. B. S. (Pass)

References 

Educational institutions established in 1957
1957 establishments in East Pakistan
Colleges in Chittagong
Public colleges in Chittagong